The Lyackson First Nation is a First Nations band government located at Chemainus, British Columbia, Canada, on Vancouver Island.

Chief and Councillors

Demographics
The Lyackson First Nation has 196 members.

Indian Reserves

The band has three Indian Reserves, all on Valdes Island: 
Lyacksun Indian Reserve No. 3, near north end of Valdes Island, 710.60 ha. 
Porlier Pass Indian Reserve No. 5, at south tip of Valdes Island, 2.0 ha. 
Shingle Point Indian Reserve No.4, 32.0 ha.

Notable people 

 “Qwul’sih’yah’maht” Dr. Robina Thomas - Vice-President Indigenous, University of Victoria

See also

Douglas Treaties

References

External links
Lyackson website

Coast Salish governments
Mid Vancouver Island